Johanneson is a surname. Notable people with the surname include:

Albert Johanneson (1940–1995), one of the first high-profile black players, of any nationality, to play top-flight football in England
Anders Johanneson Bøyum (1890–1962), Norwegian politician for the Liberal Party
Carl Johanneson (born 1978), super featherweight boxer

Patronymic surnames
Surnames from given names